Petkovšek's algorithm (also Hyper) is a computer algebra algorithm that computes a basis of hypergeometric terms solution of its input linear recurrence equation with polynomial coefficients. Equivalently, it computes a first order right factor of linear difference operators with polynomial coefficients. This algorithm was developed by Marko Petkovšek in his PhD-thesis 1992. The algorithm is implemented in all the major computer algebra systems.

Gosper-Petkovšek representation 
Let  be a field of characteristic zero. A nonzero sequence  is called hypergeometric if the ratio of two consecutive terms is rational, i.e. . The Petkovšek algorithm uses as key concept that this rational function has a specific representation, namely the Gosper-Petkovšek normal form. Let  be a nonzero rational function. Then there exist monic polynomials  and  such that

and

 for every nonnegative integer ,
 and
.

These polynomials can be computed explicitly. This construction of the representation is an essential part of Gosper's algorithm. Petkovšek added the conditions 2. and 3. of this representation which makes this normal form unique.

Algorithm 
Using the Gosper-Petkovšek representation one can transform the original recurrence equation into a recurrence equation for a polynomial sequence . The other polynomials  can be taken as the monic factors of the first coefficient polynomial  resp. the last coefficient polynomial shifted . Then  has to fulfill a certain algebraic equation. Taking all the possible finitely many triples  and computing the corresponding polynomial solution of the transformed recurrence equation  gives a hypergeometric solution if one exists.

 algorithm petkovsek is
     input: Linear recurrence equation .
     output: A hypergeometric solution  if there are any hypergeometric solutions.
 
     for each monic divisor  of  do
         for each monic divisor  of  do
             for each  do
                 
         
         for each root  of  do
             Find non-zero polynomial solution  of 
             if such a non-zero solution  exists then
                 
                 return a non-zero solution  of 
If one does not end if a solution is found it is possible to combine all hypergeometric solutions to get a general hypergeometric solution of the recurrence equation, i.e. a generating set for the kernel of the recurrence equation in the linear span of hypergeometric sequences.

Petkovšek also showed how the inhomogeneous problem can be solved. He considered the case where the right-hand side of the recurrence equation is a sum of hypergeometric sequences. After grouping together certain hypergeometric sequences of the right-hand side, for each of those groups a certain recurrence equation is solved for a rational solution. These rational solutions can be combined to get a particular solution of the inhomogeneous equation. Together with the general solution of the homogeneous problem this gives the general solution of the inhomogeneous problem.

Examples

Signed permutation matrices 
The number of signed permutation matrices of size  can be described by the sequence  which is determined by the recurrence equationover . Taking  as monic divisors of  respectively, one gets . For  the corresponding recurrence equation which is solved in Petkovšek's algorithm isThis recurrence equation has the polynomial solution  for an arbitrary . In fact it is (up to a constant) the only hypergeometric solution and describes the number of signed permutation matrices.

Irrationality of  
Given the sum

 

 

Given this recurrence, the algorithm does not return any hypergeometric solution, which proves that  does not simplify to a hypergeometric term.

References 

Combinatorics